The Newcastle and Hunter River Steamship Company (NHRS Co) was a shipping company of Australia. The company was created by the merger of the Newcastle Steamship Company and the Hunter River New Steam Navigation Company in 1891. It operated to 1956.

References

Transport companies established in 1891
Defunct shipping companies of Australia
Hunter Region
1956 disestablishments in Australia
Transport companies disestablished in 1956
Australian companies established in 1891